Robert Gober (born September 12, 1954) is an American sculptor. His work is often related to domestic and familiar objects such as sinks, doors, and legs.

Early life and education

Gober was born in Wallingford, Connecticut and studied literature and then fine art at Middlebury College, Vermont and the Tyler School of Art in Rome. Gober settled in New York in 1976 and initially earned his living as a carpenter, crafting stretchers for artists and renovating lofts. He also worked as an assistant to the painter Elizabeth Murray for five years.

Work
Gober's work is often related to domestic and familiar objects such as sinks, doors, and legs, and has themes of nature, sexuality, religion, and politics. The sculptures are meticulously handcrafted, even when they appear to just be a re-creation of a common sink. While he is best known for his sculptures, he has also made photographs, prints, drawings and has curated exhibitions.

In 1982-83, Gober created Slides of a Changing Painting, consisting of 89 images of paintings made on a small piece of plywood in his storefront studio in the East Village; he made a slide of each motif, then scraped off the paint and began again. One of his most well known series of more than 50 increasingly eccentric sinks – made of plaster, wood, wire lath, and coated in layers of semi-gloss enamel – he produced in the mid-1980s.

By 1989, Gober was casting beeswax into sculptures of men's legs, completed not only with shoes and trouser legs but also human hair that was inserted into the beeswax.

In the Whitney Biennial 2012, Gober curated a room of Forrest Bess's paintings and archival materials dealing with the artist's exploration into hermaphrodism. He also curated "Heat Waves in a Swamp: The Paintings of Charles Burchfield" at the Hammer Museum in Los Angeles in 2009 (which traveled to the Burchfield Penney Art Center, Buffalo and the Whitney Museum of American Art, New York in 2010).

Art plays a role during the AIDS epidemic 
During the AIDS epidemic in the 1980s, Robert Gober, along with other artists, used art to support the AIDS Coalition to Unleash Power (ACT UP). ACT UP was a large group of people that were infuriated by the lack of action from the government and scientists to stop the spread of AIDS and find a cure. A few artists, including Gober, organized an art auction to help raise funds to donate to ACT UP. Gober's Untitled (Leg) (1989-1990) alone was sold at a very high price, which helped prove to the public that art can be used to make the voices of the people be heard, to fight for a cause that is important to the communities, and that art is not just a commodity, nor is art just for pleasure. Robert Gober's sculptures portrayed a different aspect to the way art had been seen, he used his sculptures to send a strong message to the viewers.

Exhibitions
In 1984, the Paula Cooper Gallery in New York hosted Gober's first solo exhibition.  The Art Institute of Chicago presented the artist's first museum exhibition in 1988. Gober has since had exhibitions of his work in Europe and North America. He represented the United States at the 2001 Venice Biennale and has had several one-person museum exhibitions including at the Museum of Contemporary Art, Los Angeles, the Jeu de Paume, Paris, and Dia Art Foundation, New York.

His work has also been included in five Whitney Biennials, including the 2000 Whitney Biennial with Sarah Sze, Doug Aitken, Cai Guo-Qiang, Louise Lawler and Richard Tuttle.

In 2007 there was a retrospective exhibition of his work at the Schaulager in Basel. The exhibition was accompanied by a comprehensive book of his sculptures entitled Robert Gober. Sculptures and Installations 1979-2007.

Gober participated in the group show Lifelike that originated at the Walker Art Center in 2012.

From October 2014 to January 2015, The Museum of Modern Art, New York presented "Robert Gober: The Heart Is Not a Metaphor", a 40-year retrospective of his work including approximately 130 sculptures, paintings, drawings, prints and photographs. This exhibition was the first large-scale display in the United States. It was also accompanied by a catalogue of the same name including essays by Hilton Als, Ann Temkin and Christian Scheidemann, plus a chronology by Claudia Carson and Paulina Pobocha with Robert Gober.

Gober created a three-story permanent installation in the Haunted House at the Fondazione Prada, Milan which opened in May 2015. In autumn 2016, two new sculptures by Gober were included in the Artangel exhibition at Reading Prison in England.

In Autumn 2018, Glenstone in Potomac, Maryland opened a long-term pavilion of his work.

Gober is represented by Matthew Marks Gallery.

Recognition
In 2013, the Hammer Museum honored Gober along with playwright Tony Kushner at its 11th Annual Gala in the Garden, with Gober being introduced by fellow artist Charles Ray. He received The Larry Aldrich Foundation Award in 1996, the Skowhegan Medal for Sculpture in 1999, and the Archives of American Art Medal in 2015. He is a member of the American Academy of Arts and Letters, as well as a fellow of the American Academy of Arts and Sciences.

Aesthetics
Traditionally the poetics associated with Rober Gober’s artworks are focused on two fields: The surreal and the spiritual: 
"The almost devotional artisanship imbues common objects with an uncommon gravity, along with the sense of energy, growth and vulnerability that defines real bodies." Roberta Smith. “He plays with the tension between the neutered forms and the strong emotional and physical connotations we attach to them.” Craig Gholson.
His artworks represent "The daily human war on dirt " Peter Schjeldahl., it works both literally and symbolically. "To be cleansed is to become pure, physically and also spiritually." David Carrier. 
“A good way to make lighter the weight of our thoughts is to sink them in water; it works for certain cases of schizophrenia -like that of our society-.” Luis Alberto Mejia Clavijo. In some cases the lavatories represent both the cyclical approach to be cleaner but the impossibility to be fully pure: "The sink still has no water, and the past will never wash off." Jason Farago.

Personal life
Gober lives with his partner Donald Moffett. They reside in New York City and Maine.

Gober served on the board of directors of the Foundation for Contemporary Arts (FCA), as well as on the board of the Hetrick-Martin Institute.

Notable works in public collections

Double Sink (1984), Art Institute of Chicago
Untitled (Sink) (1984), Rubell Museum, Miami
The Slanted Sink (1985), National Gallery of Art, Washington, D.C.
Single Basin Sink (1985), Los Angeles County Museum of Art
The Subconscious Sink (1985), Walker Art Center, Minneapolis
Three Parts of an X (1985), Hirshhorn Museum and Sculpture Garden, Smithsonian Institution, Washington, D.C.
Two Urinals (1986), Glenstone, Potomac, Maryland
Two Partially Buried Sinks (1986-1987), Glenstone, Potomac, Maryland
Untitled Door and Door Frame (1986-1987), Walker Art Center, Minneapolis
Untitled Closet (1989), Glenstone, Potomac, Maryland
Untitled Leg (1989-1990), Museum of Modern Art, New York
Drains (1990), Tate, London
Untitled (1990), Hirshhorn Museum and Sculpture Garden, Smithsonian Institution, Washington, D.C.
Untitled (1990), San Francisco Museum of Modern Art
Untitled (1991), Museum of Modern Art, New York
Prison Window (1992), Museum of Modern Art, New York
Untitled (1992), Glenstone, Potomac, Maryland
Short Haired Cheese (1992-1993), Metropolitan Museum of Art, New York
Untitled (1993-1994), Crystal Bridges Museum of American Art, Bentonville, Arkansas; and Whitney Museum, New York
Untitled (2000-2001), Art Institute of Chicago
Untitled (2003), Hirshhorn Museum and Sculpture Garden, Smithsonian Institution, Washington, D.C.
Untitled (2003-2005), Museum of Modern Art, New York
Untitled (2006-2007), Musée National d'Art Moderne, Paris
Heart in a Box (2014-2015), Whitney Museum, New York

References

External links
Robert Gober at the Matthew Marks Gallery 
artcyclopedia
San Francisco museum of art
collection at the Guggenheim
1978-2000: Rephotographs
Milwaukee Art Museum

Middlebury College alumni
People from Wallingford, Connecticut
1954 births
Living people
Sculptors from Connecticut
LGBT people from Connecticut
American gay artists
Members of the American Academy of Arts and Letters